VETEMENTS (from vêtements []; French for "clothing") started in 2014 as a luxury fashion brand and "design collective" founded by Georgian fashion designers Demna Gvasalia and Guram Gvasalia. The brand became popular in just three short seasons.

In 2019 Demna left the brand. Guram Gvasalia is the current Creative Director.

Runway shows
Vetements first collection was presented a gallery during the AW14-15 season in Paris, France.

The second collection Vetements' first show, was for the SS15 season, and was presented at Espace Pierre Cardin in Paris, France.

The third collection, AW15-16 was shown again during Paris Fashion Week, was shown at Le Dépot, a sex club in Paris. The SS16 show took place on October 1, 2015, at Le Président Restaurant in the Belleville neighborhood in Paris, France.

The AW16-17 show took place at the American Cathedral of Paris on Paris' famous avenue George V.

For the SS17 season, Vetements were invited to show on the first evening of Paris Haute Couture Fashion Week, during store hours at the famous French department store, Galeries Lafayette underneath its famous cupola. Vetements worked with 17 different heritage brands including Brioni and Juicy Couture to present a runway full of varying collaborations each representing the mastery of their individual markets.

The AW17-18 show took place at Centre Georges Pompidou, the largest museum for modern art in Europe on January 24, 2017.

The SS18 collection was launched with a "NO SHOW" event, consisting of a concert and exhibit of photographs taken by Demna Gvasalia of the new collection as shoot around Zurich, Switzerland, where they had recently moved its headquarters.

For their AW18-19 collection, Vetements returned to the runway, this time off the official calendar, showing outside of Paris in the antique markets of Marché Paul Bert Serpette in Saint-Ouen, France.

The brand's SS19 collection, its tenth collection, reflected deeply on the Gvasalia's upbringing in and eventual departure from war-torn Georgia. It took place in Paris on July 1, 2018, underneath the Boulevard Périphérique. Many street cast models were flown in from Georgia for the show.

References

External links 
 

Luxury brands
Companies based in Zürich